Adnet is a town in the district of Hallein, in the Austrian state of Salzburg. It is famous for its marble and there is a marble museum in the middle of the town.

Geography
Adnet is situated near Hallein in the metropolitan area of Salzburg.
Urban districts are: Adnet, Riedl, Spumberg, Waidach, Wimberg.

Coat of arms
The coat of arms of the municipality: on a golden shield between three red-marmoreal round stones is a black lion, in the right hand it is holding a black stonemason's hammer on its red shaft.

Name Origin
The name originates from the Celtic (Atanate, Atanat, Attnat). It means swamp (situated by the water).

Twinning
Adnet is twinned with:
  Oppenheim, Germany

References

External links
 Adnet
 marble museum

Cities and towns in Hallein District